is a Japanese footballer currently playing as a centre back for YSCC Yokohama, on loan from Urawa Red Diamonds.

Career statistics

Club
.

Notes

References

External links

2000 births
Living people
Japanese footballers
Association football defenders
J3 League players
Urawa Red Diamonds players
Gainare Tottori players
YSCC Yokohama players